During the 1985–86 season, the Scottish football club :Hibernian F.C. was placed 8th in the :Scottish Premier Division. The team reached the final of the :Scottish League Cup, losing to Aberdeen, and also reached the semifinals of the :Scottish Cup.

Scottish Premier Division

Final League table

Scottish League Cup

Scottish Cup

See also
List of Hibernian F.C. seasons

References

External links
Hibernian 1985/1986 results and fixtures, Soccerbase

Hibernian F.C. seasons
Hibernian